Explorations Academy is an independent school in Bellingham, Washington, United States that integrates experiential education with academic studies. The school was founded in 1995 as a program of the not-for-profit educational organization Global Community Institute.

 As a non-public secondary school, Explorations is fully accredited by the Northwest Accreditation Commission. Explorations Academy is also a Candidate Member of the Northwest Association of Independent Schools.  Graduates have been accepted to many diverse colleges, and typically enter the college of their choice upon graduation. 

With a small student body of capable young people (currently 41), Explorations Academy cultivates a dynamic learning community atmosphere, in which self-directed learning is emphasized and individual students have a voice in their own education.  Advanced interpersonal skills such as compassionate communication, conflict resolution, and leadership are part of the required coursework.  The school's overarching focus is preparing students for responsible global citizenship in the 21st Century.

Experiential learning activities include frequent field outings—averaging one day per week—that provide students with learning activities throughout the Pacific Northwest.  Explorations Academy also conducts frequent service-learning opportunities to build citizenship, and incorporates extended study/service expeditions to places as diverse as Guatemala, Indonesia, Nicaragua, Thailand, Ireland, Kenya, India, and Cuba.  These international expeditions, while cultivating global awareness, also give students life-changing learning opportunities, including a profound appreciation for cultural differences, the ability to work well as a team, and the capacity for enduring difficult circumstances.

When students are not in the field, they study at the Explorations Academy campus, located in downtown Bellingham.  The facility includes approximately 7000 square feet (650 square meters) that encompasses classrooms, offices, a library, a commons (including kitchen), a rooftop greenhouse, and an auditorium.  The school is intentionally located near public transportation, in a building that features a green roof and solar panels, near the urban core but also along a habitat corridor.

Explorations Academy Curriculum
The Explorations curriculum is built around theme-based interdisciplinary units called clusters.  Each cluster includes college-preparatory academic coursework in three to five subject areas.  Students study fine arts, foreign language, PE, and occupational education in addition to the core academic subjects.  Coursework typically includes study, lecture, and discussion in class as well as field outings to investigate the applications of academic learning.  In keeping with preparation for college, the school's program is reading and writing intensive, with a high degree of individual student responsibility.

External links
 School website

High schools in Whatcom County, Washington
Schools in Bellingham, Washington
Private high schools in Washington (state)
Preparatory schools in Washington (state)